Presidente Alves is a municipality in the state of São Paulo in Brazil. The population is 4,080 (2020 est.) in an area of 287 km2. The elevation is 576 m.

References

Municipalities in São Paulo (state)